Voya Financial is an American financial, retirement, investment and insurance company based in New York City. Voya began as ING U.S., the United States operating subsidiary of ING Group, which was spun off in 2013 and established independent financial backing through an initial public offering. In April 2014, the company rebranded itself as Voya Financial. Voya's predecessors had first entered the U.S. market in the 1970s.

Operations

The company's main center for broker-dealer (the ING Financial Partners division) and annuities businesses is located in Des Moines, Iowa.  This center was first established in 1997 and employed 400 as of late 2014.  On July 31, 2017, Voya entered into an agreement with  Cognizant to outsource a broad range of IT services, resulting in layoffs and jobs transferred to Cognizant.

References

Further reading

External links
 

Banks based in New York City
Companies based in New York City
Banks established in 2013
Financial services companies established in 2013
American companies established in 2013
Companies listed on the New York Stock Exchange